François Porcile (born 3 March 1944 in Paris) is a French film director, essayist, film historian and musicologist.

Biography 
A lover of cinema - Porcile entered the profession first of all through editing - François Porcile was also very early attracted by music. Throughout his career as a filmmaker and musicographer, he declined and combined his two artistic passions by connecting them intimately. As film director, François Porcile,  directed more than 150 films, short and feature films, fiction and documentaries, for film and television especially for Gaumont, the INA, Arte, FR3 or TF1. His filmography covers many themes, from history (Vents d'est, vents d'ouest; Mise à mort d'une république; Propaganda - L'image et son pouvoir), to visual arts (Élie Faure ou l'esprit des formes; André Derain thèmes et variations) including photography (Le Paris de Robert Doisneau), cinema (Émile Cohl image par image), literature (Itinéraire d'Alejo Carpentier) or various social facts (Quinze jours en août, l'embellie; Femmes de la mine; Les veilleurs du Val).

A musicographer specializing in French music and music in the cinema, he was musical adviser on four films by François Truffaut, using notably unpublished scores of composer Maurice Jaubert. In addition, linking cinema and music, he made several portraits of composers including  (Maurice Jaubert, Henri Dutilleux, Édith Canat de Chizy, Louis Durey, Betsy Jolas) and interpreters (Frédéric Lodéon and Benoît Thivel). For FR3 or Arte he filmed a series of concerts (Nocturne, 40 programs conceived by Dominique Jameux), two operas (L'Heure espagnole by Maurice Ravel and La clemenza di Tito by Christoph Willibald Gluck) as well as a ballet by Josef Nadj (La Mort de l'empereur).

As musicographer, he signed several major works on music, including two on French music from 1871 to 1965, published by Fayard, a monograph of Maurice Ohana (co-written with Édith Canat de Chizy), interviews with violinist Jean Leber and composer Édith Canat de Chizy, and a book (co-written with Bruno Giner on the institutions and musical stakes in Spain during the Civil War (1936–1939).

Several of his films have been awarded (Colombo Festival in 1974, Besançon festival in 1986) as well as several of his musicographies including the Prix Armand Tallier in 1972 for Maurice Jaubert, musicien populaire ou maudit le prix du Syndicat de la critique in 2001 and of the Académie Charles Cros in 2002 for Les conflits de la musique française 1940-1965 and another prize of the Académie Charles Cros for Maurice Ohana, co-written with Édith Canat de Chizy (2005).

François Porcile taught the history and aesthetics of film music at Universities Paris III and Paris VIII (1972–1984) as well as the Idhec (1974-1979), La Fémis (1997-2002) and the Conservatoire de Paris (2001–2006). At the request of the Arte channel, he completed the reconstruction of original scores composed for silent films, including The Wonderful Lies of Nina Petrovna by Hanns Schwarz, Maldone by Jean Grémillon and Carmen by Jacques Feyder.

Publications on film and music 
1965: Défense du court métrage français, collection 7e Art, Éditions du Cerf 
1969: Présence de la musique à l'écran, Éditions du Cerf
1971: Maurice Jaubert : Musicien populaire ou maudit ?, les Éditeurs français réunis, (Prix Armand-Tallier in 1972)
1992 La Musique à l'écran, Cinémaction  n°62, directed by François Porcile and Alain Garel, Éditions Corlet / SACEM / Télérama, 
1995: Les Musiques du cinéma français, with Alain Lacombe, Bordas, 
1999: La Belle Époque de la musique française : le Temps de Maurice Ravel, 1871–1940, Fayard, 
2001: Les Conflits de la musique française, 1940–1965, Fayard  (Prix du Syndicat de la critique in 2001 and of the Académie Charles Cros in 2002)
2005: Maurice Ohana, with Édith Canat de Chizy, Fayard 
2008: Images de la musique française de piano (1871–1940), Musée des Beaux-arts d'Orléans
2008: Édith Canat de Chizy : entre nécessité et liberté, preface by Richard Millet, Cig’art édition 
2014: D'un coup d'archet... une vie en musique, entretiens avec Jean Leber, MF Editions
2015: Les musiques pendant la guerre d'Espagne, with Bruno Giner, Editions Berg International

Filmography

Director and screenwriter 
 1966: La Saison prochaine
 1967: Louis Durey ou le printemps au fond de la mer
 1969: Le Salon des refusés
 1970: A ciel ouvert
 1972: Le Paris de Robert Doisneau, (Prix du court métrage au Festival de Colombo) 
 1973: Élie Faure ou L'esprit des formes
 1978: Émile Cohl image par image (codirected with Michel Patenaude) 
 1980: André Derain, thèmes et variations (Sélection officielle française au 1981 Cannes Film Festival) 
 1981: Robert Doisneau, badaud de Paris, pêcheur d'images
 1985: Un compositeur pour le cinéma : Maurice Jaubert
 1985: L'Heure espagnole (Primé au Festival de Besançon 1986) 
 1989: Des années frileuses
 1989: Itinéraire d'Alejo Carpentier
 1990–1991: Jours et nuits du théâtre (cowritten with Denys Clerval)  
 1991: Vive l'original
 1994: La Marelle de Chris Marker
 1996: Quinze jours en août, l'embellie
 2001: Les Voix de l'imaginaire, portrait of Édith Canat de Chizy
 2002: Femmes à la mine
 2010: Vive le son !
 2012: Une histoire aussi vieille que moi

Screenwriter 
 1983: Lettres du bagne 
 1984: L'embranchement 
 1985: Le Monde désert

Actor 
 1969: Bartleby by Jean-Pierre Bastid

Music advisor 
Films by François Truffaut:
 1975: L'Histoire d'Adèle H.
 1976: L'Argent de poche
 1977: L'Homme qui aimait les femmes
 1978: La Chambre verte

References

External links 
 François Porcile on Télérama
 François Porcile on Fayard
 

1944 births
Writers from Paris
Living people
French film historians
French film directors
French documentary filmmakers
French screenwriters
20th-century French writers
21st-century French writers
20th-century French musicologists
21st-century French musicologists